In the context of Hindu scriptures, "Nidhi" is a treasure, constituted of nine treasures (nawanidhi) belonging to Kubera (also spelt as Kuvera), the god of wealth. According to the tradition, each nidhi is personified as having a guardian spirit, and some tantrikas worship them. The nature and characteristics of nidhis have remained largely unexplained and have not been fully understood.

The Nidhis 
According to [Amarakosha], the Nine nidhis are:

 Mahapadma also known as the"great lotus flower"
 Padma also known as "lotus flower"
 Shankha also known as "conch"
 Makara also known as "crocodile"
 Kachchhapa also known as "tortoise"
 Kumud also known as the "a particular precious stone"
 Kunda also known as "jasmine"
 Nila also known as "sapphire"
 Kharva also known as "dwarf"

When considered as mines, minerals, earthenware, and ocean resources, the nine treasures of Kubera are interpreted as:
 mahapadma (lake double the size of Padma in Himalaya with minerals and jewels)
 padma  (lake in Himalaya with minerals and jewels)
 shankha (conch shell)
 makara  (synonym of Padmini, black antimony)
 kachchhapa (tortoise or turtle shell)
 kumud (cinnabar, or quicksilver)
 kunda (arsenic)
 nila (antimony)
 kharva (cups or vessels baked in fire)

Nidhis are also called Nidhana, Nikhara, and Sevadhi. Some of the nidhis' names are used in the Indian numbering system.

References
 A Dictionary of Hindu Mythology & Religion by John Dowson
 A Classical Dictionary of Hindu Mythology and Religion, Geography, History, and Literature, by John Dawson, page 221
 Amarakosha, ed. W. L. Shastri Pansikar, v. 142
 Megha-duta, collected works, iv. 372. verse 534
 A Hindu Granth (Holy Book) named as 'SHIV-PURAAN'.
 Also mentioned in 'VISHNUSAHASTRANAAM'.

 Objects in Hindu mythology